Dear Dad was the 12th episode of the first season of the American TV series M*A*S*H.

Dear Dad may also refer to:
Dear Dad...Again of M*A*S*H
Dear Dad... Three of M*A*S*H
Dear Dad (Medium), an episode of  Medium, an American television series
Dear Dad, an episode of  Council of Dads (TV series), an American television series
Dear Dad, an episode of British children's television series The Story of Tracy Beaker (series 4)
Dear Dad (2016 film), Hindi film
, Russian comedy film starring Vladimir Vdovichenkov
"Dear Dad", track from The Journey (Ky-Mani Marley album)
"Dear Dad", track from Chuck Berry in London
"Dear Dad", track from We Were Here (Turin Brakes album)
"Dear Dad", track from The Masters Apprentices (1967 album)
"Dear Dad", track from First Born (The Plot in You album)
"Dear Dad", track from "Music of Battlestar Galactica"
"Dear Dad", reggae single by Ky-Mani Marley
Dear Dad, album by Zack Knight
Dear Dad, 2006 book by Bradley Trevor Greive
Caro papà, English title: Dear Dad, in List of Don Matteo episodes

See also